The 2011–12 Necaxa is the second season of Necaxa on the Liga de Ascenso . The season is split into two tournaments—the Torneo Apertura and the Torneo Clausura—each with identical formats and each contested by the same sixteen teams. Necaxa will begin their season on July 29, 2011 against Mérida, Necaxa will play their homes games on Fridays at 8:10pm local time.

Torneo Apertura

Squad

 (Captain)

Regular season

Apertura 2011 results

Final phase

Neza advanced 3 – 2 on aggregate

Goalscorers

Results summary

Results by round

Transfers

In

Out

Torneo Clausura

Pre-Season Games

Squad

Regular season

Clausura 2012 results

Final phase

Necaxa advanced because of their better position on the league table

Lobos BUAP advanced 3 – 1 on aggregate

Goalscorers

Results summary

Results by round

References

Mexican football clubs 2011–12 season